S. graveolens may refer to:
 Sanicula graveolens, the northern sanicle or Sierra blacksnakeroot, a flowering plant species found in the Americas  
 Stanhopea graveolens, an orchid species occurring from Mexico to Honduras

See also